"Take Me Away" is a song from popular British trance and house singer Tiff Lacey. It's the first single from her first full-length solo album titled "¡Viva!".

Release
"Take Me Away" was released on March 9, 2011 on iTunes, including Original, Stereojackers, Tom Noize, Loverush UK!, Sequence 11 and Darren Flinders mixes. An unreleased Michael Badal remix leaked onto the internet.

Song information
"Take Me Away" was originally written by Tiff Lacey back in 2006 for a collaboration with Tom Kent, who produced the music for the track. Because of unknown reasons the song was not signed to a label until 2010 when the singer signed to Loverush Digital and the label decided to take the song and to eventually release it as a single. During the recording process of Tiff Lacey's solo album, it was considered that "Take Me Away" would be a good choice both to be included on the album and to be released as its lead single, because of the funky, catchy sound, combined with fresh lyrics and Lacey's good vocal performance. The track went under heavy remixing from several DJs, who added even more commercial vibe, turning it into a club banger.

Music video
Tiff Lacey created several videos for the different mixes of the song herself.

Mixes
 01. Take Me Away (Original Club Mix)
 02. Take Me Away (Loverush UK! Remix)
 03. Take Me Away (Tom Noize Remix)
 04. Take Me Away (Stereojackers Remix)
 05. Take Me Away (Darren Flinders Remix)
 06. Take Me Away (Sequence 11 Remix)
 07. Take Me Away (Damien S Remix)
 08. Take Me Away (Andre Tolsen Remix)
 09. Take Me Away (Michael Badal Remix)
 10. Take Me Away (Paul Tony Remix)
 11. Take Me Away (Original Radio Edit)
 12. Take Me Away (Loverush UK! Radio Edit)
 13. Take Me Away (Tom Noize Radio Edit)
 14. Take Me Away (Stereojackers Radio Edit)

2011 singles
Progressive house songs
2011 songs